The Lyngen Alps are a mountain range in northeastern Troms og Finnmark county in Norway, east of the city of Tromsø. The mountain range runs through the municipalities of Lyngen, Balsfjord, and Storfjord. The mountains follow the western shore of the Lyngen fjord in a north-south direction. The mountains dominate the Lyngen Peninsula, which is bordered by the Lyngen fjord to the east, and the Ullsfjorden to the west. The British climber William Cecil Slingsby was the first to climb many of the peaks.

The mountains are of alpine character, popular among extreme skiers. There are several glaciers in the mountains. The Lyngen Alps are sufficiently high as to give rain shadow in the interior lowland areas east of the mountains.

References

External links
Visit Lyngenfjord

Mountain ranges of Norway
Landforms of Troms og Finnmark